Las Noches del Hombre Lobo (also known as Nights of the Wolf Man) is a 1968 Spanish horror film about the werewolf Count Waldemar Daninsky, played by Paul Naschy. It has always been referred to as the second of Paul Naschy's 12 "Hombre Lobo" films. However, there are serious doubts as to whether the film was actually made; no one, including Naschy himself, has ever seen it. It was never theatrically released, nor has it ever turned up on video. It is considered today to be a lost film.

Nights was followed by the third film in the series in 1969, Los Monstruos del Terror (The Monsters  of Terror).

Authenticity
Naschy was the only person who ever insisted that this movie (which he said he wrote) was actually filmed. He insisted in interviews that he filmed his scenes for this film in Paris. The story is that the director, a man named Rene Govar, was killed in a car accident in Paris the week after the film was sent off to the lab for processing, and that since no one ever paid the negative costs, the lab held onto the film for collateral and later misplaced it or discarded it.  To make matters even stranger, the lead actors whom Naschy attributed to this film (Peter Beaumont and Monique Brainville) apparently never existed; Naschy could not even recall the names of any other actors who starred in this film. Rene Govar has no other directorial credits on IMDb, nor is there a record of a director named Rene Govar ever working in the French film industry. This is why most Naschy fans regard this movie listing as either a hoax or an error, some thinking that Naschy may even have made it up at the time to boost his resume when he was just starting out in the film industry. However, till the day Naschy died, he insisted that this film once existed.

Plot
Seeing how this is a lost film, little is known about its plot. All that is known of it, as mentioned in an interview by Naschy himself, is that the story deals with a professor who learns that a student of his suffers from lycanthropy, and under the guise of helping him, uses him as an instrument of revenge by controlling him by means of sound waves whenever he transforms. It is possible this film later became the 1970 La Furia del Hombre Lobo (The Fury of the Wolfman), as the plots of the two films are very similar, and that would explain why Nights no longer exists. Someone on a fan site claimed they saw a still photo from this film, but it could have actually been a still from Fury of the Wolf Man with a variant title printed on it by the distributor, especially since Fury'' was only released to theaters five years after it was completed.

Cast
 Paul Naschy as Waldemar Daninsky
 Peter Beaumont as The Mad Scientist, Dr. Wolfstein 
 Monique Brainville 
 Beba Novak 
 Helene Vatelle
Note - None of these actors exist (with the exception of Naschy)

References

External links

French horror films
Spanish werewolf films
1968 films
1960s lost films
Lost horror films
Lost Spanish films
Waldemar Daninsky series
1960s French films